Statistics of Belgian First Division in the 1935–36 season.

Overview

It was contested by 14 teams, and Daring Club won the championship.

League standings

Results

References

Belgian Pro League seasons
Belgian First Division, 1935-36
1935–36 in Belgian football